M. P. Michael (born 2 December 1958), better known by his stage name Lal, is an Indian actor, director, screenwriter, producer and distributor who predominantly works in Malayalam and Tamil films and in a few Telugu films. Lal has won several awards, including a National Film Award – Special Mention for acting (2012), two Kerala State Film Award for Best Actor (2008, 2013), and a Filmfare Award for Best Actor – Malayalam (2008). He is the owner of Lal Media Arts, a post-production studio.

Early life 
Lal was born as Michael to the late M. A. Paul and late Philomina, as their eldest son. He received his schooling at St. Augustine's High School, Ernakulam. His brother Alex Paul is a music composer in the Malayalam film industry and his son Jean is a movie director in the same industry.

Career 
He started his career as a mimicry artist in Kalabhavan, along with his childhood friend Siddique, who would later team up as Siddique-Lal to make many films. Lal and Siddique began their film career working as assistant directors to Fazil in Nokkethadhoorathu Kannum Nattu.

Siddique-Lal production had never been dependent on star value or superstar formula that was witnessed in those days in Malayalam cinema. They had always opted out from casting Mohanlal or Mammootty. Ultimately, both of them had changed their thoughts later and when their fourth production film was to get launched, Siddique-Lal had opted for Mohanlal and made Vietnam Colony (1992) which did wonders in the box office too. The duo again had combined in their fifth production and made Kabooliwala (1994), which was also a success.

After that, both decided to part ways as a director pair and Lal turned producer with the Siddique-directed Mammootty-starrer Hitler. Lal debuted in acting with a villain role as Paniyan in Suresh Gopi-starrer Kaliyattam, directed by Jayaraj. Kaliyattam was a new take on Othello, where Lal played Paniyan, the character standing for Iago. He runs a film post-production company named as Lal Media Arts, Kochi. The year 2009 saw his comeback again as a director. He directed the sequel to In Harihar Nagar named 2 Harihar Nagar, which got released and was declared a hit. For his performance in the 2012 film Ozhimuri, he won the National Film Award – Special Mention. He was the winner of two state film Awards for Best Actor in Thalappavu (2008), Ayaal (2013) and Zachariayude Garbhinikal (2013).

Lal, who also plays an important role in Karthi's Sulthan (2021) and also heaped praise on Mari Selvaraj for Karnan (2021). Despite being given the most uni-dimensional character in the story Taanakkaran (2022), the actor effortlessly carries the role and leaves arguably more impact than in his previous outing.

Personal life 
Lal is married to Nancy and they have two children—Jean Paul Lal and a daughter. Jean Paul is a film director.

Awards

Filmography

As an actor

Director, writer

Producer, distributor

Other crew credits 
1987: Manivathoorile Aayiram Sivarathrikal – Script supervisor and assistant director (as Siddique–Lal)

References

External links 
 
 Lal Actor/ Director SNP Database

Malayalam film directors
Male actors from Kochi
1958 births
Living people
Kerala State Film Award winners
Malayalam screenwriters
Male actors in Malayalam cinema
Indian male film actors
Filmfare Awards South winners
Indian male screenwriters
Film directors from Kochi
20th-century Indian male actors
21st-century Indian male actors
Male actors in Telugu cinema
Film producers from Kochi
Screenwriters from Kochi
20th-century Indian film directors
21st-century Indian film directors
20th-century Indian dramatists and playwrights
21st-century Indian dramatists and playwrights
Malayalam film producers
20th-century Indian male writers
21st-century Indian male writers
Special Mention (feature film) National Film Award winners